Homateni (Ho-ma-te-ni) is an Oshiwambo name from the Ovawambo tribe in northern Namibia. Oshiwambo is mostly spoken by the majority tribe in Namibia but this tribe can also be found in Angola. Homateni simply means "get armed". Most of the Namibian children were given this name as they were born during the Namibian liberation struggle or earlier after independence. One of the known cadre with this name is Jusa J Homatani Jox W2 from Onhuno

Tribes of Africa
Namibian culture